Sergei Ilyich Shemetov (18 September 1872, Orenburg Governorate — after 1930, Kurgan Oblast) was a scribe, a teacher, a head of a village (stanytsia otaman), a deputy of the Third Imperial Duma from Orenburg Governorate between 1907 and 1912. He founded a hotel ("paid dacha") in 1912, initiating the spa practice in the Trans-Urals region. He became a member of the "commission for the capture of the Bolsheviks" during the Russian Civil War; during Soviet era he became a lishenets, an insurance agent and a seller.

Literature 
 Шеметов Сергей Ильич (in Russian) // Государственная дума Российской империи: 1906—1917 / Б. Ю. Иванов, А. А. Комзолова, И. С. Ряховская. — Москва: РОССПЭН, 2008. — P. 695. — 735 p. — .
 Шеметовъ (in Russian) // Члены Государственной Думы (портреты и биографии). Третий созыв. 1907—1912 гг. / Сост. М. М. Боиович. — Москва, 1913. — P. 211. — 526 p.
С.И. Шеметов: Казак, атаман и депутат (in Russian) // Зауральские парламентарии в Государственной Думе Российской империи : информационный бюллетень / Курганская областная Дума. — Курган, 2016. — № 339.

1872 births
Year of death missing
People from Kurgan Oblast
People from Chelyabinsky Uyezd 
Progressive Party (Russia) politicians
Members of the 3rd State Duma of the Russian Empire